Laura Tucker-Longsworth OBE is a politician and nurse in Belize. In January 2017, she became the Speaker of the Belize House of Representatives.

Education
Tucker-Longsworth holds a master's degree in nursing. She is a co-ordinator for the Registered Nurse bachelor's programme at the University of the West Indies Open Campus in Belize.

Career
She was a founding member of the Belize Cancer Society, also serving as its president. She is chair of the National AIDS Commission and of the disciplinary committee for the Nurses and Midwives Council of Belize. Tucker-Longsworth is also a director of the Healthy Caribbean Coalition.

In 2015, she was appointed an Officer of the Order of the British Empire.

References 

Date of birth missing (living people)
Living people
Officers of the Order of the British Empire
Speakers of the House of Representatives (Belize)
Women nurses
United Democratic Party (Belize) politicians
Year of birth missing (living people)
Belizean nurses